Aborolabis mauritanica is a species of earwig in the genus Aborolabis, the family Anisolabididae, the suborder Forficulina, and the order Dermaptera. Found primarily in the Palearctic realm, but also in parts of the Afrotropical realm, this species was discovered by Hippolyte Lucas in 1846.

References 

Anisolabididae
Insects described in 1846